The Palais de la Nation (French; Palace of the Nation) is a building in Gombe, Kinshasa, which since 2001 serves as the official residence of the President of the Democratic Republic of the Congo. It is located in the north of Kinshasa, on the banks of the Congo River.

After Congolese independence from Belgium in 1960, the Palais became a symbol of the new state. The official ceremonies surrounding independence, including King Baudoin's Proclamation, declaring the Congo's independence and Patrice Lumumba's speech denouncing colonialism, took place in the palais on 30 June. It briefly served as the seat of the Congolese parliament, now based in the Palais du Peuple, after independence.

Following the restoration of the Congo after the fall of Mobutu Sese Seko, the mausoleum of Laurent-Désiré Kabila was built in front of the palace.

References

External links
Official website of the Congolese President

Buildings and structures in Kinshasa
Politics of the Democratic Republic of the Congo
Lukunga District